Jeffery Lewis Tallon  (born 1948) is a New Zealand physicist specialising in high-temperature superconductors.

Early life and education
Tallon was born in Hamilton on 17 December 1948, the son of Phyllis Blanche Tallon (née Currie) and George Frederick Tallon. He was educated at Mount Albert Grammar School in Auckland from 1962 to 1966. After a BSc(Hons) at the University of Auckland, he undertook doctoral studies at Victoria University of Wellington under Stuart Smedley and Bill Robinson, completing his PhD in chemistry in 1976.

In 1971, Tallon married Mary Elaine Turner, and the couple went on to have three children.

Academic career
He was awarded a Doctor of Science by Victoria University of Wellington in 1996, on the basis of a selection of published papers.

Honours and awards
In 1990, Tallon was awarded the Michaelis Medal for physics research. He was elected a Fellow of the Royal Society of New Zealand in 1993, and in 1998 he won the society's Hector Medal jointly with Paul Callaghan. In 2002, Tallon was awarded the Rutherford Medal, the highest award in New Zealand science. In 2011 Tallon was awarded the Dan Walls Medal by the New Zealand Institute of Physics.

In 1990, Tallon received the New Zealand 1990 Commemoration Medal. In the 2009 Queen's Birthday Honours, he was appointed a Companion of the New Zealand Order of Merit, for services to science.

References

External links
 MacDiarmid Institute page
 Callaghan Innovation page

1948 births
Living people
People from Hamilton, New Zealand
People educated at Mount Albert Grammar School
University of Auckland alumni
Victoria University of Wellington alumni
Academic staff of the Victoria University of Wellington
New Zealand chemists
New Zealand physicists
Fellows of the Royal Society of New Zealand
Companions of the New Zealand Order of Merit
Recipients of the Rutherford Medal
20th-century New Zealand scientists
21st-century New Zealand scientists